Brandon Ellis (born 3 August 1993) is a professional Australian rules footballer currently playing for the Gold Coast Suns in the Australian Football League (AFL).

Early life and junior football
Ellis was raised in the inner-suburb of Carlton North, four kilometres north of Melbourne. 

He first played football in the Auskick program in Brunswick at the age of four. At age seven he began playing with the under 10s side at West Coburg where he won the best and fairest award despite being many years younger than most of his teammates.

Ellis quit football temporarily in year 10 in the aftermath of his father's terminal cancer diagnoses.

He later played representative football with the Calder Cannons in the TAC Cup where he played 29 games across his bottom and top aged seasons.

Ellis represented the Victorian Metro side at the 2010 Under 18 national championships. He recorded a 76 per cent disposal efficiency and the most score involvements of any defender in the competition. He earned All-Australian selection for his performances.

He attended high school at Princes Hill Secondary College in the Melbourne suburb of North Carlton.

AFL career

Richmond (2012–2019)
Ellis was drafted to Richmond with the 15th selection in 2011 National Draft.

He debuted on Round 1 the following season, in a 44-point loss to traditional rivals .

Ellis placed equal fifth at the club in the Brownlow Medal tally that year, recording 5 votes. The same year he was selected in the inaugural AFL Players Association 22under22 team, as one of the best young players in the league.

Ellis received the Jack Titus medal in 2014, for finishing second in the Richmond Best-and-Fairest count. He led the club in disposals and rebound 50s and placed fourth in the club at the Brownlow Medal. He was also nominated to the All-Australian squad of 40 but was ultimately not selected to the final side. That same year he earned his second selection to the AFLPA's 22under22 team.

Ellis had another strong season in 2015, relishing his role as the club's number one outside midfielder. He topped the club for uncontested possessions and ranked second for total disposals. He failed to make an impact in Richmond's losing elimination final however, recording only 10 disposals on the day.

Between round 4 2014 and round 18 2015, Ellis recorded a club record streak of 27 straight matches with 20 or more disposals.

He played his 100th AFL game in Round 12, 2016, against the Gold Coast Suns at the Melbourne Cricket Ground. He finished the season ranked 3rd at the club for disposals in 2016.

In 2017 he changed roles, shifting from the wing and into Richmond's half back line.

After 111 consecutive matches played at AFL level, Ellis was omitted from the Richmond side to face  in round 6, 2018. It was his first missed match since round 12, 2013. He returned to senior football in round 10, after spending four weeks with the club's reserves side at VFL level. After playing in each of the final 13 matches of the season, Ellis was dropped from the club's side for the Qualifying final against  in order to make way from the injury return of All-Australian squad member Kane Lambert.

In 2019 Ellis returned to a role on the wing. He finished the 2019 season by playing in a winning grand final, his second premiership in three seasons at Richmond.

He had played 176 games over eight seasons at Richmond.

Gold Coast (2020–)

Ellis played in 16 of a possible 17 games in his COVID-19 pandemic affected first season at Gold Coast, placing fifth in the club's best and fairest award.

Statistics
 Statistics are correct to the end of the 2022 season

|-  
! scope="row" style="text-align:center" | 2012
|style="text-align:center;"|
| 42 || 21 || 2 || 8 || 183 || 147 || 330 || 80 || 36 || 0.1 || 0.4 || 8.7 || 7.0 || 15.7 || 3.8 || 1.7 || 0
|-
! scope="row" style="text-align:center" | 2013
|style="text-align:center;"|
| 5 || 21 || 14 || 7 || 246 || 144 || 390 || 124 || 45 || 0.7 || 0.3 || 11.7 || 6.9 || 18.6 || 5.9 || 2.1 || 5
|-  
! scope="row" style="text-align:center" | 2014
|style="text-align:center;"|
| 5 || 23 || 10 || 11  || 355 || 246 || 601 || 126 || 56 || 0.4 || 0.5 || 15.4 || 10.7 || 26.1 || 5.5 || 2.4 || 9
|-
! scope="row" style="text-align:center" | 2015
|style="text-align:center;"|
| 5 || 23 || 8 || 11 || 342 || 252 || 594 || 146 || 77 || 0.4 || 0.5 || 14.9 || 11.0 || 25.8 || 6.3 || 3.3 || 7
|-  
! scope="row" style="text-align:center" | 2016
|style="text-align:center;"|
| 5 || 22 || 5 || 9 || 290 || 230 || 520 || 134 || 56 || 0.2 || 0.4 || 13.2 || 10.5 || 23.6 || 6.1 || 2.5 || 3
|-
| bgcolor=F0E68C | 2017#
|style="text-align:center;"|
| 5 || 25 || 7 || 4 || 331 || 226 || 557 || 126 || 51 || 0.3 || 0.2 || 13.2 || 9.0 || 22.3 || 5.0 || 2.0 || 1
|-  
! scope="row" style="text-align:center" | 2018
|style="text-align:center;"|
| 5 || 18 || 3 || 4 || 202 || 154 || 356 || 87 || 38 || 0.2 || 0.2 || 11.2 || 8.6 || 19.8 || 4.8 || 2.1 || 0
|-
| bgcolor=F0E68C | 2019#
|style="text-align:center;"|
| 5 || 23 || 9 || 3 || 269 || 216 || 485 || 116 || 57 || 0.4 || 0.1 || 11.7 || 9.4 || 21.1 || 5.0 || 2.5 || 0
|-  
! scope="row" style="text-align:center" | 2020
|style="text-align:center;"|
| 4 || 16 || 5 || 3 || 194 || 99 || 293 || 68 || 42 || 0.3 || 0.2 || 12.1 || 6.2 || 18.3 || 4.3 || 2.6 || 0
|-
! scope="row" style="text-align:center" | 2021
|style="text-align:center;"|
| 4 || 18 || 5 || 2 || 273 || 150 || 423 || 130 || 47 || 0.3 || 0.1 || 15.2 || 8.3 || 23.5 || 7.2 || 2.6 || 5
|-  
! scope="row" style="text-align:center" | 2022
|style="text-align:center;"|
| 4 || 21 || 9 || 6 || 314 || 146 || 460 || 115 || 47 || 0.4 || 0.3 || 15.0 || 7.0 || 21.9 || 5.5 || 2.2 || 5
|-
|- class="sortbottom"
! colspan=3| Career
! 231
! 77
! 68
! 2999
! 2010
! 5009
! 1252
! 552
! 0.3
! 0.3
! 13.0
! 8.7
! 21.7
! 5.4
! 2.4
! 35
|}

Notes

Honours and achievements
Team
 2× AFL premiership player: 2017, 2019
 McClelland Trophy: 2018

Individual
AFL Rising Star nominee: 2012
Yiooken Award: 2015
Jack Titus Medal (2nd RFC B&F): 2014
5th place, Gold Coast B&F: 2020
3× 22under22 team: 2013, 2014, 2015

Personal life
His father was treated for kidney cancer when Ellis was a child and in 2009, also received a terminal throat cancer diagnoses but overcame the illness through six months of extensive radiation and chemotherapy.

As a child, Ellis grew up and lived in a housing commission flat in Melbourne's inner north. As a teenager he was frequently exposed to the crime prevalent in the area including regular incidents of his clothes being stolen from the flat's shared clothesline, himself thieving clothes from city retailers and watching friends stabbed and assaulted in front of him.

References

External links

 
 
 Brandon Ellis's statistics from Footy Wire

Living people
1993 births
Calder Cannons players
Australian rules footballers from Melbourne
Richmond Football Club players
Richmond Football Club Premiership players
Gold Coast Football Club players
Two-time VFL/AFL Premiership players